The 1999 Ogun State gubernatorial election occurred in Nigeria on January 9, 1999. The AD nominee Olusegun Osoba won the election defeating the PDP candidate.

Olusegun Osoba emerged AD candidate.

Electoral system
The Governor of Ogun State is elected using the plurality voting system.

Primary election

AD primary
The AD primary election was won by Olusegun Osoba.

Results
The total number of registered voters in the state was 1,592,502. Total number of votes cast was 403,260 while number of valid votes was 391,395. Rejected votes were 11,865.

References 

Ogun State gubernatorial elections
Ogun State gubernatorial election
Ogun State gubernatorial election
Ogun State gubernatorial election